The following highways are numbered 586:

United States